Nicolette Fernandes, (born June 19, 1983) is a professional squash player who represented Guyana. She won the only gold medal for Guyana at the 2006 Central American and Caribbean Games in Colombia beating Samantha Terán in the final which lasts in 5 sets. In 2007, Fernandes suffered a knee injury which kept her out of action for 23 months. 

In February 2010, Fernandes was named Guyanese Sportswoman of the year for the year 2009 by the Guyanese National Sports Commission (NSC). Fernandes also appears in the WISPA 2010 calendar girl which features the top WISPA squash players in designer swimwear. She reached a career-high world ranking of World No. 19 in October 2013. On 28 August 2022, Fernandes became the first Guyanese to win a World Master's title when she secured a gold medal at the World Master's Championship in Poland.

Career statistics
Listed as the following:-

Professional Tour Titles (1)
All Results for Nicolette Fernandes in WISPA World's Tour tournament

WISPA Tour Finals (Runner-Up) (1)

August 28, 2022 World Masters Squash Championship, Gold Medal

See also
 Official Women's Squash World Ranking
 WISPA Awards

References

External links 

Guyanese female squash players
Sportspeople from Toronto
Living people
1983 births
Canadian sportspeople of Guyanese descent
Commonwealth Games competitors for Guyana
Squash players at the 2010 Commonwealth Games
Squash players at the 2014 Commonwealth Games
Pan American Games bronze medalists for Guyana
Squash players at the 2011 Pan American Games
Pan American Games medalists in squash
Central American and Caribbean Games gold medalists for Guyana
Central American and Caribbean Games silver medalists for Guyana
Central American and Caribbean Games bronze medalists for Guyana
Competitors at the 2002 Central American and Caribbean Games
Competitors at the 2006 Central American and Caribbean Games
South American Games gold medalists for Guyana
South American Games bronze medalists for Guyana
South American Games medalists in squash
Competitors at the 2010 South American Games
Central American and Caribbean Games medalists in squash
Medalists at the 2011 Pan American Games